Delta State University (DSU)  is a public university in Cleveland, Mississippi, a city in the Mississippi Delta.

History
The school was established in 1924 by the State of Mississippi, using the facilities of the former Bolivar County Agricultural High School, which consisted of three buildings in Cleveland. On February 19, 1924, Senators William B. Roberts and Arthur Marshall cosponsored Senate Bill No. 263, which established Delta State Teachers College, which Mississippi Governor Henry L. Whitfield signed on April 9, 1924; the bill had been sponsored in the Mississippi House of Representatives by Nellie Nugent Somerville, the first woman to serve in the Mississippi state legislature. The three buildings were Hill Hall, an administration and classroom building, Hardee Hall, a men's dormitory, and Taylor Hall, a women's dormitory.

On February 14, 1924, James Wesley Broom was appointed president of the college, and the college opened its doors on September 15, 1925. In May 1926, Broom died following complications from an ear infection. William Zeigel was named his successor. The seal of the college was designed in 1928 as a project of an art class.

World War II greatly affected the college. Anticipating the war in 1941, the college created a civilian pilot training program. When the war began, 254 Delta State students joined the armed forces. When the war ended, student enrollment at Delta State increased from 185 to 483, aided by the federal program for veterans known as the GI Bill to encourage education.

During the 1947 session of the Delta Council, Dean Acheson (Under-Secretary of State in Truman's administration) delivered a speech on campus that unveiled the Marshall Plan. He detailed plans for postwar relief and investment in Europe to help the nations recover from destruction.

In 1955, the name Delta State Teachers College was changed to Delta State College. Delta State earned full accreditation from the Southern Association of Colleges and Schools in 1963. It developed graduate programs, which it opened for admission in 1965. Given graduate program and research development, in 1974 the state legislature authorized the college to be named as the current Delta State University.

In 1965, Delta State initiated a graduate program (Master of Education in Elementary Education, Elementary Supervision, Guidance, English, History, Math, Music, Social Studies, Business Education, Physical Education, and Science).

From 1925 to 1967 the university had a whites-only race admission policy. Thirteen years after the U.S. Supreme Court decision in Brown v. Board of Education (1954), ruling that racial segregation in public schools was unconstitutional and three years after passage of the Civil Rights Act of 1964, the state and administration ended racial segregation at DSU. Shirley Antoinette Washington was the first African-American student to enroll at DSU that year.

Beginning in the 1980s, the university developed an aviation program, which continues.

In 2005, Delta State assisted evacuees from Hurricane Katrina by opening Hugh White Hall as temporary housing.

Presidents
 James Wesley Broom – 1925–1926
 Dr. William Marion Kethley – 1926–1956
 Dr. James Milton Ewing – 1956–1971
 Dr. Aubrey Lucas – 1971–1975
 Dr. Kent Wyatt – 1975–1999
 Dr. David Potter – 1999–2002
 Dr. John Thornell – 2002–2003 (interim)
 Dr. John Hilpert – 2003–2013
 William N. LaForge – 2013–2022

Campus

About 30 percent of students reside in on-campus housing. Delta State provides both men's dormitories and women's dormitories, as well as apartments for married students.

Most of the 64 buildings on campus use a particular brick pattern of yellow, orange, and white bricks. Particularly famous facilities at Delta State University are the large natatorium for holding swimming competitions, the Bologna Performing Arts Center (pictured left) with two theaters (one that seats 1,178, and another that seats 135), and the sound recording studios of the Delta Music Institute.

Mascots
Delta State has two mascots (one official, one unofficial). Since its inception, Delta State's sports teams have officially been known as the Statesmen because of the role State Rep. Walter Sillers, Jr. played in the location of the school in Cleveland. Sillers was speaker of the Mississippi House of Representatives for 20 years. The teams with female athletes are called the Lady Statesmen.

However, since the late 1980s, the student body has embraced a mascot that depicts a piece of okra wearing boxing gloves and brandishing a fierce expression. The Fighting Okra was featured on an ESPN commercial during the 2023 College National Championship Game.

Academics
Delta State provides an undergraduate curriculum, offering 12 baccalaureate degrees in 42 majors. The university also advances student training through certain fields by providing graduate programs of study for eight master's degrees, the Education Specialist degree, and the Doctor of Education degree.
 College of Arts and Sciences
 College of Business
 College of Education
 School of Nursing

Athletics

The Delta State University Department of Athletics sponsors thirteen intercollegiate sports, competing at the NCAA Division II level. DSU is affiliated with the Gulf South Conference and New South Intercollegiate Swim Conference. The institution competes intercollegiately in men's American football, basketball, baseball, swimming, diving, tennis, soccer, and golf. The women's intercollegiate program consists of basketball, tennis, fast-pitch softball, cross-country, swimming, soccer, cheerleading, and diving.

One of Delta State's most notable sports coaches was (Lily) Margaret Wade (1912–1995). Wade played on the basketball team for Delta State, but the school dropped the sport when she was 19. The school claimed the sport was "too strenuous for young ladies". Wade responded, "We cried and burned our uniforms but there was nothing else we could do." Basketball was revived in 1973, and Wade was asked to coach the team. She coached the women's basketball team to three consecutive AIAW national championships and a 93–4 record, including a 51-game winning streak, at the time, the longest winning streak in women's college basketball. One star of these championship teams was Luisa (Lucy) Harris, who was drafted by the New Orleans Jazz in 1977. Wade was elected to the Basketball Hall of Fame in 1985. Today, the Division I women's basketball player of the year receives the Margaret Wade Trophy.

Lloyd Clark, a native of Drew, took over the women's basketball program in 1983. Over the next 19 years he compiled a staggering 494–98 record. In addition, Clark's teams won three NCAA Women's Division II Basketball Championships. During those years, DSU played in the NCAA tournament 16 times, with 11 appearances in the Elite Eight. Clark's 1988–89 team became the first NCAA team to win a National Championship on its home floor. During his career, Clark compiled a record of 206–38 (.845) in Gulf South Conference Games. Lloyd Clark is a member of the Mississippi Sports Hall of Fame along with other DSU heroes Margaret Wade, Lusia Harris-Stewart, and former Boston Red Sox pitcher Dave "Boo" Ferriss.

Ferriss coached the baseball program for nearly thirty years and led them to three appearances in the NCAA Division II College World Series before retiring in 1988. Boo was born in Shaw, Mississippi. San Francisco Giants catcher Eli Whiteside played baseball for the university, as did Los Angeles Dodgers pitcher Brent Leach. Matt Miller of the Cleveland Indians also played for the Statesmen.

One notable would-be baseball player and student who was cut during tryouts was writer John Grisham. In 2008, Grisham returned to the campus to join Ferriss in an evening of baseball tales, raising more than $100,000 for the athletic program.

Delta State alumnus Jeremy Richardson was an NBA player.

Delta State won the 2004 NCAA Division II national baseball championship.
Coach Mike Kinnison has guided the Statesmen to the 2004 NCAA National title, four College World Series appearances, nine NCAA South Regional appearances (1999–2005, 2007, 2008), 11 GSC West Division titles (1997–2005, 2007, 2008), three NCAA South Regional championships, and four Gulf South Conference titles.

Delta State won the 2000 NCAA Division II national football championship. Delta State's football team won the Gulf South Conference Championship in 1998, 2000, 2007, 2008, 2010, 2011, 2014, and 2022.
They were runner-up in the D-2 National Championship in 2010.
They were national semi-finalists and regional champions in 2011.

Flight school
Delta State has a fairly large flight school and is also the only university in Mississippi to offer a degree in Commercial Aviation.

Academic buildings 
 Gibson-Gunn Building
 Flight Instruction Building

Fleet
 the DSU fleet of 19 aircraft consists of the following:

5 Cessna 152
5 Cessna 172P
5 Cessna 172R
1 Cessna U206G
3 Diamond DA42 L360

DSU Flight Operations has two large hangars located at Cleveland Municipal Airport and the Gibson-Gunn Commercial Aviation building on the Delta State Campus.

Student life

Residence halls and student housing
There are six student residence halls on campus; three house women, two house men and one is co-ed.

Greek life
Even though Delta State University has relatively few fraternities and sororities on campus, many students participate in Greek life. Originally, Delta State had only local organizations, such as Delta Alpha Omega or the Cavaliers, which existed until the mid-1960s, when their members joined Kappa Alpha Order and Pi Kappa Alpha respectively. However, the first national social fraternity to charter at Delta State was Phi Mu Alpha Sinfonia, in 1960. Within the decade, several other chapters of national Greek-letter organizations chartered at Delta State. They are governed by two independent councils—the Interfraternity Council, and the Panhellenic Council.

National Pan-Hellenic Council
The Delta State National Pan-Hellenic Council governs the chapters represented in the National Pan-Hellenic Council.
Alpha Kappa Alpha, Mu Gamma Chapter, 1978 (The Phirst and the Finest)
Alpha Phi Alpha, Omicron Psi Chapter (Suave House), 1983
Delta Sigma Theta, Kappa Pi Chapter, September 22, 1973
Kappa Alpha Psi, Nu Eta Chapter, P.O.D.C
Omega Psi Phi, Upsilon Delta Delta, 1996
Phi Beta Sigma, The "Untouchable" Xi Beta Chapter, 1982
Zeta Phi Beta, The PHInomenal Psi Kappa Chapter, April 8, 1981
Sigma Gamma Rho, Upsilon Iota Chapter, December 12, 2021

Panhellenic Council
The Delta State Panhellenic Council is a governing body that governs three sorority chapters.
Delta Delta Delta, Phi Phi Chapter, 1962
Kappa Delta, Gamma Psi Chapter, 1962
Phi Mu, Kappa Epsilon Chapter, 1966
Zeta Tau Alpha (inactive)

Professional fraternities and honor societies
 Alpha Eta Rho (Professional Aviation Fraternity)
 Alpha Psi Omega (theatre honor society), Zeta Epsilon Chapter, founded 1935 (inactive)
 Kappa Pi (art honor society) – DSU is home to Kappa Pi National President Ron Koehler
 Mu Phi Epsilon (professional music fraternity), Gamma Zeta Chapter
 Omicron Delta Kappa (leadership society)
 Phi Alpha (Social Work honor society)
 Pi Kappa Lambda (music honor society)

Notable graduates

Steve Azar, country musician
Jack Gregory, professional football player
Lusia Harris, professional basketball player, Olympian
Jeanette W. Hyde, US ambassador in the Caribbean 
Anthony Maddox, professional football player 
Aubrey Matthews, professional football player
Charlotte P. Morris, university administrator
Scott Nagy, college basketball coach
Rowan Nathaniel House, artist
Viola B. Sanders, American naval officer
Chase Sherman, mixed martial artist
Eli Whiteside, professional baseball player and coach

References

Further reading

External links

 
 Delta State Athletics website

 
Educational institutions established in 1924
Public universities and colleges in Mississippi
Universities and colleges accredited by the Southern Association of Colleges and Schools
Education in Bolivar County, Mississippi
Buildings and structures in Bolivar County, Mississippi
1924 establishments in Mississippi
Cleveland, Mississippi